Ten Empty is a 2008 Australian film directed by Anthony Hayes and starring Brendan Cowell, Geoff Morrell, Lucy Bell, and Jack Thompson.

The film premiered at the 2008 Sydney Film Festival.

Production
The film was written by Anthony Hayes and Brendan Cowell, who were good friends. Hayes said they were interested in exploring Australian masculinity:
After The Castle there was a string of comedies trying to replicate that success with cardboard cut-out characters, which really annoyed me. That's what we were working against in Ten Empty. That surface wit. Men cracking jokes instead of dealing with their emotions. What happens when you run out of jokes? The people I grew up with kept things to themselves, but they'd open up too. The average Aussie bloke is not just a beer-swilling idiot, and we wanted to show that.
The film was shot in Adelaide.

References

External links

Ten Empty at Urban Cinefile
Ten Empty at JJJ
Ten Empty on At the Movies
Anthony Hayes interview at SBS Movie Show
Review at If Magazine
Review at Real Time Arts

Australian drama films
2000s English-language films
2000s Australian films